Alexander Zamm (born in Woodstock, New York) is an American film director and screenwriter. Zamm has directed such films as My Date with the President's Daughter, Tooth Fairy 2, The Pooch And The Pauper, Dr. Dolittle: Million Dollar Mutts, R.L. Stine’s: The Haunting Hour, Snow, and Woody Woodpecker.

Early life
Zamm grew up in Woodstock, New York,

Filmography

Film

Television

References

External links

Living people
Columbia University School of the Arts alumni
Place of birth missing (living people)
People from Woodstock, New York
Binghamton University alumni
Film directors from New York (state)
Screenwriters from New York (state)
20th-century American screenwriters
20th-century American male writers
21st-century American screenwriters
21st-century American male writers
American male screenwriters
Year of birth missing (living people)